Ekonomija i Biznis (Macedonian Cyrillic: Економија и Бизнис), translated Economy and Business is a magazine published in North Macedonia.

Activity
In November 2016, the magazine Economics and Business held its first independent conference titled "25 Years Independent Republic of Macedonia, what we learned about the Macedonian economy and how to do it?", attended by NBRM Governor Dimitar Bogov, Chief Executive Officer of Sparkasse Macedonia, Gligor Bishev, General Director of "Ferroinvest", Koco Angjushev, President of the Economic Chamber of Macedonia, Branko Azeski, Chairman of the Board of Tikves Winery, Svetozar Janevski, Chief CEO of MSE Ivan Steriev.

References

1998 establishments in the Republic of Macedonia
Business magazines
Magazines established in 1998
Mass media in Skopje
Monthly magazines
Magazines published in North Macedonia